Wu Chunlan (born 19 November 1972) is a Chinese former synchronized swimmer who competed in the 1996 Summer Olympics.

References

1972 births
Living people
Chinese synchronized swimmers
Olympic synchronized swimmers of China
Synchronized swimmers at the 1996 Summer Olympics
Asian Games medalists in artistic swimming
Artistic swimmers at the 1994 Asian Games
People from Shantou
Synchronized swimmers from Guangdong
Asian Games silver medalists for China
Medalists at the 1994 Asian Games